The WAGR V class was the last class of steam locomotive to enter service with the Western Australian Government Railways (WAGR). The class was part of the post war regeneration plan for the WAGR, intended for the heavy coal traffic between the Collie coal fields and Perth.

Engineering background

Twenty-four locomotives were ordered in 1951 from Beyer, Peacock and Company, Manchester. Capacity issues saw construction of the locomotives subcontracted to Robert Stephenson & Hawthorn's Darlington works although still issued with Beyer Peacock builders numbers. The locomotives entered service between April 1955 and November 1956.

The locomotive was of a modern design with a high superheat, a large combustion chamber and a thermic syphon in the firebox. Roller bearings were used on all the locomotive and tender wheels. When introduced the V class was the largest rigid wheelbase locomotive on the WAGR system, exceeded only by the Australian Standard Garratt.
The class was designed to have as many parts as possible interchangeable with the W class. It was designed with the intention of being converted to standard gauge, however when the new gauge arrived 10 years later, more powerful diesel locomotives were introduced and the V class saw out their days on the narrow gauge network.

Operational history
The rated load capacity was 1,320 tons between Brunswick Junction and Armadale, compared to 1,135 tons for the S class and 850 tons for the Fs class. By all accounts the V class were a reliable and free-steaming locomotive. The V class locomotives entered service in 1955 and initially worked heavy coal trains from the Collie area. Later they were used on equally heavy freight trains, particularly over the Great Southern line from York to Albany. Most were condemned in June 1971, with the remainder following in August 1972. On 25 June 1972. V1220 hauled the final WAGR steam hauled service, the Farewell to Steam special from Brunswick Junction to Collie.

Preservation
Four of the class have survived. Three are owned by preservation societies, whilst the fourth, V1213, is owned by the private rail operator Pemberton Tramway Company who provided Driver Experience courses, in addition to hauling some timber on its railway. The haulage of timber ceased in 2005.

Various records suggest that the V Class were considered for preservation by the South Australian Steamtown Peterborough Railway Preservation Society.

Class list
The numbers and periods in service of each member of the V class were as follows:

See also

Rail transport in Western Australia
List of Western Australian locomotive classes

References

Notes

Bibliography

External links

Beyer, Peacock locomotives
Freight locomotives
Railway locomotives introduced in 1955
Robert Stephenson and Hawthorns locomotives
V WAGR class
2-8-2 locomotives
3 ft 6 in gauge locomotives of Australia